The women's halfpipe competition of the Nagano 1998 Olympics was held at Kanbayashi Snowboard Park.

Results

Qualifying

Round 1
The top four automatically qualified for the final.

Round 2
The top four finishers qualified for the final.

Final

The eight finalists each competed in two runs, with the total score counting for ranking.

References 

Women's Halfpipe
1998 in women's sport
Women's events at the 1998 Winter Olympics